The 1953 Southern Illinois Salukis football team was an American football team that represented Southern Illinois University (now known as Southern Illinois University Carbondale) in the Interstate Intercollegiate Athletic Conference (IIAC) during the 1953 college football season.  Under second-year head coach William O'Brien, the team compiled a 2–7 record. The team played its home games at McAndrew Stadium in Carbondale, Illinois.

Schedule

References

Southern Illinois
Southern Illinois Salukis football seasons
Southern Illinois Salukis football